La Ruda is an alternative rock group from Saumur, France formed in 1993. The group was initially called La Ruda Salska, a name inspired by the Polish town: Ruda Śląska; but also by their musical tastes (rock, ska, salsa), and the type of music they produced. In 2003, after over 10 years of performing as La Ruda Salska, four albums, one of which was live, and nearly 500 concerts, they opted to shorten their name to "La Ruda". This also marked a change in their musical style as they now sound more like a rock band with a brass section.

Band members
The current band members are Pierrot (lead vocals, lyrics), Manu (drums), Fred (guitar, vocals), Ritchoune (guitar, vocals), Bruixe (Xavier) (bass, since 2005), Roro (trombone, vocals), Philly (saxophone, vocals, since 1997), and Daddy (Michel) (trumpet).

Former members are Jam (bass, 1993–1999), Pee-Why (bass, 1999–2005), François (saxophone, 1993–1997), Grub's (bass, 1993–1995), and Yannos (guitar, 1993–1995)

Discography

Studio albums

Live albums

DVD

References

External links
 Official Site in French
 La Ruda on MySpace
 TousEnLive La Ruda

Musical groups from Pays de la Loire
French ska groups
French punk rock groups